Great Floridian is a title bestowed upon notable citizens in the state of Florida by the Florida Department of State. There were two formal programs.

Great Floridians 2000
The Florida Department of State and the Florida League of Cities created the program in 1998 to help celebrate the approaching end of the millennium. The process dedicated a special series of commemorative panels in cities throughout the state recognizing deceased individuals who made significant contributions to the history and culture of Florida. A total of 385 persons were honored.

Great Floridians Program
In 2007, the legislature resurrected, revised and formalized Great Floridians in Florida law as Florida Statute 267.0731. A defined committee consisting of the top members of the Executive and Legislative branches of government meets each year to nominate citizens for designation. The Florida Secretary of State then selects at least two nominees for the honor. As of 2011, 58 people had been included.

Governor Rick Scott added 22 names in 2013, including former Miami Dolphins Coach Don Shula, former University of Florida Gators football player and coach Steve Spurrier, 2012 Masters golf champion Bubba Watson Jr., former Florida Supreme Court Chief Justice Richard Ervin, and Dr. Pedro Jose Greer Jr., an advocate for homeless and the disadvantaged in Miami, as well as Betty Sembler of St. Petersburg, who championed drug treatment efforts, former Tampa Bay Buccaneers coach Tony Dungy, General Norman Schwarzkopf, who led U.S. forces in Iraq, former state agriculture commissioner Charles H. Bronson, former state treasurer Bill Gunter, Walt Disney, Patrick D. Smith, agricultural leader Ruth Springer Wedgworth, former Buccaneers linebacker Derrick Brooks, Hall of Fame running back Emmitt Smith, former Florida Supreme Court Justice Alto L. Adams, Spanish explorer Juan Ponce de León, retired General Craig McKinley, clothing designer Lilly Pulitzer, entrepreneur H. Wayne Huizenga, and James Robert Cade, an American physician, university professor, research scientist, and inventor who led research efforts that developed Gatorade.

Great Floridians Program
 (on-going)

Great Floridians 2000 (program ended in 2000)

References

External links
Florida Division of Historical Resources: Great Floridians 2000 Program
Great Floridian Program

Great Floridians
Great Floridians